Carlos Urías (born 1 January 1975) is a Mexican professional boxer. He's the former WBA Fedebol, WBA Fedecentro, and WBC FECOMBOX lightweight Champion.

Professional career
On March 14, 2008 Urías lost to Humberto Soto at the Auditorio Benito Juárez in Los Mochis.

In June 2008, Urías beat the veteran José Luis Soto Karass by T.K.O. to win the WBA Fedecentro lightweight title.

References

External links

Boxers from Sinaloa
Sportspeople from Los Mochis
Welterweight boxers
1975 births
Living people
Mexican male boxers